The 4th Corps is a field corps of the Turkish Land Forces. Its headquarters is in Ankara, and its is directly responsible to the Commander of the Land Forces (as of 2023).

It was established in the Ankara area in 1966. In 1974, it appears to have been part of the Second Army. Nigel Thomas's NATO Armies 1949-87, published in 1987, attributed the 4th, 8th, and 9th Corps to the Third Army.

In accordance with NATO's new strategy in the early 1990s, Turkey agreed to commit forces to NATO's ACE Rapid Reaction Corps. "Turkish Land Forces went through a very significant reorganisation program between 1991 and 1993. Within the framework of this reorganisation, most divisions were deactivated with the exception of a few. [However], the decision was made to create a new division. Thus, the old 1st Infantry Division which had been abolished many years ago was reactivated and renamed as 1 TU Mech Inf Div and attached to 4 TU Corps on 30 November 1993." Major Generals :tr:Oktar Ataman, promoted 1992, and :tr:Orhan Yöney commanded the division. The division's 9th Brigade was then disestablished circa 2004.

References

Corps of Turkey